The Central Bank of Malaysia (BNM) is the Malaysian central bank. Established on 26 January 1959 as the Central Bank of Malaya (Bank Negara Tanah Melayu), its main purpose is to issue currency, act as banker and adviser to the government of Malaysia and regulate the country's financial institutions, credit system and monetary policy. Its headquarters is located in Kuala Lumpur, the federal capital of Malaysia.

The Bank is the only institution permitted to issue the Malaysian ringgit into circulation.

Powers of the Bank 

The Central Bank is empowered through enactment of legislation by the Parliament of Malaysia. New legislation are created and current legislation is amended to reflect the needs of the time and future.

Development Financial Institutions Act 2002 

Promotes the development of effective and efficient development financial institutions.

Central Bank of Malaysia Act 2009 

Provides the establishment, administration and powers of the bank. This act repealed the Central Bank of Malaysia Act 1958.

Money Services Business Act 2011 

Provides for regulation of money services business industry which consists of remittance, wholesale currency and currency exchange businesses.

Financial Services Act 2013 

Consolidates the regulatory and supervisory framework for Malaysia's banking industry, insurance industry, payment systems, and other relevant entities. The Act also includes money market oversight and foreign exchange administration matters. This act repealed Banking and Financial Institutions Act 1989, Insurance Act 1996 (though sections 144, 147(4), 147(5), 150, 151 and 224 of the Insurance Act 1996 continue to remain in full force and effect by virtue of section 275 of FSA 2013), Payment Systems Act 2003 and Exchange Control Act.

Islamic Financial Services Act 2013 

Sets out the regulatory framework for Malaysia's Islamic financial sector with the principal regulatory objectives of promoting financial stability and compliance with Shariah. This act repealed Islamic Banking Act 1983 and Takaful Act 1984.

Governors

Headquarters and branches 

The Central Bank headquarters are located at Jalan Sultan Salahuddin, off Jalan Kuching.

Landmarks located near the Central Bank building include Dataran Merdeka, St Mary's Cathedral, Kuala Lumpur City Hall building, Lake Gardens, Kuala Lumpur and the Tugu Negara.

The Central Bank had previously maintained branches in each of the state capitals. Most of them were closed in the 1990s when retail banks began taking over most of the counter services. There are still branches maintained in Penang, Johor Bahru, Kota Kinabalu, Kuching, Kuala Terengganu and Shah Alam. Some branches were converted into currency distribution and processing centres.

The Central Bank also retains representative offices in London, New York City, and Beijing.

A new building for the Financial Services and Resources Center (FSRC) was constructed in 2004 to house the FSRC, SEACEN, IFSB and the FMAG (the museum arm of BNM). Located along Jalan Dato Onn, in front of the Tun Hussein Onn Memorial, the building was designed by renowned Malaysian architect firm, Hijjas Kasturi Associates. Officially declared opened in August 2011, the building is now known as Sasana Kijang.

History 

In 1837 the Indian rupee was made the sole official currency in the Straits Settlements, but in 1867 silver dollars were again legal tender. In 1903 the Straits dollar, pegged at two shillings and fourpence (2s. 4d.), was introduced by the Board of Commissioners of Currency and private banks were prevented from issuing notes. Since then, the were two lapses in the continuity of the currency, first by the Japanese occupation (1942–1945), and again by the devaluation of the Pound Sterling in 1967 when notes of the Board of Commissioners of Currency of Malaya and British Borneo lost 15% of their value.

On 12 June 1967, the Malaysian dollar, issued by the new central bank, Central Bank of Malaysia, replaced the Malaya and British Borneo dollar at par. The new currency retained all denominations of its predecessor except the $10,000 denomination, and also brought over the colour schemes of the old dollar.

In 1985, following the "Plaza meeting" of G-5 finance ministers in New York City, the US dollar fell sharply causing major losses in Central Bank's dollar reserves. The bank responded by starting a program of aggressive speculative trading to make up these losses. Jaffar Hussein, the Central Bank Governor at the time, referred to this strategy as "honest-to-God trading" in a December 1988 speech in New Delhi.

In the late 1980s, Central Bank, under Governor Jaffar Hussein, was a major player in the forex market. Its activities caught the attention of many; initially, Asian markets came to realise the influence the Central Bank had on the direction of forex market. Alan Greenspan, the Federal Reserve's chairman, later realised BNM's massive speculation activities and requested the Malaysian central bank to cease those activities.

On 21 September 1990, BNM sold between $500 million to $1 billion worth of pound sterling in a short period of time, driving the pound down 4 cents to the dollar. In response, bankers began front running the Central Bank's orders. Two years later on Black Wednesday, BNM attempted to defend the value of the British pound against attempts by George Soros and others to devalue the pound sterling. George Soros won and BNM reportedly suffered losses of more than US$4 billion. The Central Bank lost an additional $2.2 billion in speculative trading a year later. By 1994, the bank became technically insolvent and was bailed out by the Malaysian Finance Ministry.

Pegging of the ringgit and reserves

In 1998, Central Bank pegged RM3.80 ringgit to the US dollar after the ringgit substantially depreciated during the 1997 Asian financial crisis. In July 2005, the central bank abandoned fixed exchange rate regime in favour of managed floating exchange rate system an hour after China floated its own currency. This resulted in capital flight of more than US$10 billion, thought to be due to the repatriation of speculative funds that entered the country in anticipation of the abandonment of the peg: Central Bank's foreign exchange reserves increased by $24 billion in the one-year period between July 2004 and July 2005 (see table below). During this period there was widespread belief that the ringgit was undervalued and that if the peg was removed, the ringgit would appreciate.

The Central Bank continues to run a negative interest rate differential to the USD. The ringgit has appreciated gradually since the peg was abandoned and as at 28 May 2007, it traded at around RM3.40 to the US dollar. Malaysia's foreign exchange reserves have increased steadily since the initial capital flight, and as at 31 March 2007 the reserves stood at approximately US$88 billion, which is approximately $10 billion more than the reserves just prior to the peg being abandoned.

On 31 July 2007, the Malaysian reserves stood at approximately US$98.5 billion, which is equivalent to RM340.1 billion. The figure increased to US$101.3 billion on 31 December 2007, which is equivalent to RM335.7 billion. Central Bank's international reserves increased further 15 days later to US$104.3 billion or RM345.4 billion.

See also 

 Bank Negara Monetary Notes
 International Centre for Education in Islamic Finance
 Real-time gross settlement

References

Notes

Bibliography

External links 

  
 Islamic Banking Law
  

Malaysia
 
Ministry of Finance (Malaysia)
Banks established in 1959
1959 establishments in Malaya